Daniela Torres Bonilla (born January 22, 1990 in Managua, Nicaragua) is a Nicaraguan model and beauty pageant titleholder who was crowned Miss Nicaragua 2015. She represented her country at the Miss Universe 2015 pageant.

Personal life

Torres lives in Managua and works as a model. She was crowned Miss Managua 2015 and represented Managua at the Miss Nicaragua contest.
She is the youngest of three sisters; her older sister, Luviana, is also a model and was first runner-up in Miss Nicaragua 2013 (their oldest sister was more interested in dance than beauty contests).

Miss Nicaragua 2015
Torres won the title of Miss Nicaragua 2015 on March 7, 2015 at Teatro Nacional Rubén Darío, Managua. She was crowned by her predecessor, Marline Barberena of Chichigalpa. Yoaska Ruiz who also represented Managua was crowned as the 1st Runner-up and was automatically declared Miss International Nicaragua 2015.

Miss Universe 2015
As Miss Nicaragua 2015, Torres competed at the Miss Universe 2015 pageant on December 20, 2015, but was unplaced.

References

External links
Official Miss Nicaragua website

1990 births
Living people
Nicaraguan beauty pageant winners
Miss Universe 2015 contestants
People from Managua